The 2021 season is DPMM FC's first season to compete in the Brunei Super League since 2005.

Pitch.BN will be their new kit manufacturer from 2021.

Squad

Brunei Super League squad

Coaching staff

Transfers

Pre-Season transfers

In

Out

Mid-season transfer

In

Out

Friendly

Team statistics

Appearances and goals

Competitions

Overview

Brunei Super League

Brunei FA Cup

See also 
 2017 DPMM FC season
 2018 DPMM FC season
 2019 DPMM FC season
 2020 DPMM FC season
 2021 DPMM FC season

Notes

References 

DPMM FC seasons